"Innocent World" is the fifth single released by Mr. Children on June 1, 1994.

Overview
"Innocent World" was Mr. Children's first No. 1 single on the Oricon Japanese charts, managing to sell 1,935,830 copies during its run on the chart and was the No. 1 selling single for Oricon's 1994 yearly chart. The title track was used  as the promotional song for the soft drink  and was also included in the Mr. Children live album 1/42 released on September 8, 1999, and also Mr. Children 1992–1995, released on July 11, 2001. The b-side "My confidence song" was included in Mr. Children's compilation album, B-Side, released on May 10, 2007.

Awards
"Innocent World" has won many awards including the 'Grand Prize (Song of the year)' at the 36th Annual Japan Record Awards, the 'Best 5 Single Award' at the 9th Annual Japan Gold Disc Awards, and the 'Silver Award' at the 13th Annual JASRAC Awards.

Track listing

Personnel 
 Kazutoshi Sakurai – vocals, guitar
 Kenichi Tahara – guitar
 Keisuke Nakagawa – bass
 Hideya Suzuki – drums

Production 
 Producer – Kobayashi Takeshi
 Arrangement - Mr. Children and Takeshi Kobayashi

References 

1994 singles
Oricon Weekly number-one singles
Mr. Children songs
Songs written by Kazutoshi Sakurai
1994 songs
Toy's Factory singles